Chkalov is a rural locality (a selo), one of two settlements, in addition to Akana, the administrative centre of the Rural Okrug, in Akaninsky Rural Okrug of Nyurbinsky District in the Sakha Republic, Russia. Its population as of the 2010 Census was 77; down from 98 recorded during the 2002 Census.

References

Notes

Sources
Official website of the Sakha Republic. Registry of the Administrative-Territorial Divisions of the Sakha Republic. Nyurbinsky District. 

Rural localities in Nyurbinsky District